Cortes Island Aerodrome  is located on Cortes Island, British Columbia, Canada.

See also
 List of airports in the Gulf Islands

References

External links
Page about this airport on COPA's Places to Fly airport directory

Registered aerodromes in British Columbia
Strathcona Regional District
Cortes Island
Airports in the Gulf Islands